The 1955 Davis Cup was the 44th edition of the Davis Cup, the most important tournament between national teams in men's tennis. 24 teams entered the Europe Zone, 7 teams entered the America Zone, and 3 teams entered the newly reinstated Eastern Zone. Burma competed for the first time.

Australia defeated Canada in the America Zone final, Italy defeated Sweden in the Europe Zone final, and Japan defeated the Philippines in the Eastern Zone final. In the Inter-Zonal Zone, Australia defeated Japan in the semifinal, and then defeated Italy in the final. In the Challenge Round Australia defeated the defending champions the United States. The final was played at the West Side Tennis Club in Forest Hills, New York, United States on 26–28 August.

America Zone

Draw

Final
Canada vs. Australia

Eastern Zone

Draw

Final
Japan vs. Philippines

Europe Zone

Draw

Final
Italy vs. Sweden

Inter-Zonal Zone

Draw

Semifinals
Australia vs. Japan

Final
Australia vs. Italy

Challenge Round
United States vs. Australia

References

External links
Davis Cup official website

 
Davis Cups by year
Davis Cup
Davis Cup
Davis Cup
Davis Cup
Davis Cup